Amrutvahini College of Engineering (AVCOE) is the best Engineering college located in the taluka of Sangamner, Ahmednagar district, Maharashtra, India. The institute is affiliated with Savitribai Phule Pune University and managed by Amrutvahini Sheti and Shikshan Vikas Sanstha. It has been accredited by the National Board of Accreditation and recognised by the All India Council for Technical Education. The institute has also been awarded an A+ Grade by the National Accreditation and Assessment Council.

Departments 

   Civil Engineering
   Automation and Robotics
   Computer Engineering
   Electronics and Computer Engineering
   Mechanical Engineering
   E&TC Engineering
   Information Technology
   Electrical Engineering

References

External links
Official website

Engineering colleges in Maharashtra
Colleges affiliated to Savitribai Phule Pune University
Education in Ahmednagar district